|}

The Badger Beers Silver Trophy is a Listed National Hunt steeplechase in England which is open to horses aged four years or older. 
It is run at Wincanton over a distance of about 3 miles and 1 furlongs (3 miles, 1 furlong and 30 yards, or 5,130 metres), and during its running there are twenty-one fences to be jumped.
It is a limited handicap race, and it is scheduled to take place each year in November.

The race was established in 1962 and was awarded Listed status in 2003.

The race was run over a distance of 2 miles and 5 furlongs before 1990.

Winners

See also
 Horse racing in Great Britain
 List of British National Hunt races

References

Racing Post:

National Hunt chases
National Hunt races in Great Britain
Wincanton Racecourse